Sandra Klemenschits and Patricia Mayr-Achleitner were the defending champions, but both chose not to participate.
Michaëlla Krajicek and Renata Voráčová won the title, defeating Yulia Beygelzimer and Elena Bogdan 7–5, 6–4 in the final.

Seeds

Draw

Draw

References
 Main Draw

ITS Cup - Doubles
ITS Cup